Olivier Dokunengo (born 4 September 1979) is a New Caledonian footballer who plays as a midfielder for AS Magenta in the New Caledonia Super Ligue.

References

1979 births
Living people
New Caledonian footballers
Association football midfielders
New Caledonia international footballers
AS Magenta players
AS Mont-Dore players
2008 OFC Nations Cup players
2012 OFC Nations Cup players